 

The High Street of Lincoln, England, (road number B1262) is a long shopping high street. The street runs from the south at the St Catherine's area roundabout and ends approximately 1.5 miles (2.4 km) north at The Strait (in effect a continuation of the High Street)

Premises
The High Street contains a number of public houses, restaurants, local shops, private homes, offices, car dealerships, department stores, chain stores, churches, a school, memorials, the River Witham, a level crossing and Sincil Bank drains. The street forms one of the busiest road access routes into the city centre of Lincoln.

Numbering
The numbering of premises is consecutive, which is slightly unusual compared with most of the UK. Number One, High Street, starts with the first building (Home Start), at the southern end and on the western side of the street, the neighbouring property is Number Two, followed by Number Three and so on. This numbering pattern continues northwards and uphill until the High Street meets The Strait. The sequential numbering system then continues southward, back down the High Street on the eastern side, until reaching a car dealership at number 471-480, which has the highest number, and is opposite number 1, High Street.

Historic character of High Street
Looking to the north, the High Street is dominated by Lincoln Cathedral, which is prominentally placed in ‘‘Uphill’’ Lincoln. While today that area is noted for the Castle and many fine Medieval and later buildings, the High Street has many important buildings scattered in amongst the more recent shopping developments. There are over 30 Listed Buildings adjacent to or facing onto the High Street. and some these such as the Guildhall and Stonebow, St Mary le Wigford  and the St Mary Guildhall are important Grade I listed buildings. The St Peter at Gowt's Conservation Area, which is towards the southerly end of the High Street, was the second conservation area to be designated in Lincoln in 1975 Historic paintings and drawings give a good idea how buildings and the street scopes of the Lincoln High Street have changed over the years. Two paintings in the Usher Gallery in Lincoln particularly demonstrate the changes that have taken place. Both paintings are taken from approximately the same position, close to the Church of St Mary le Wigford. The earliest of these which may date from around 1800 by Henry Hall shows the cobbled streets lined with buildings of the Georgian period, most of which have now disappeared. In the distance is the obelisk shaped water conduit that was placed on the High Bridge over the river Witham to supply the street with water. Beyond this and below the cathedral is the church tower of St Peter at Arches, which was demolished in 1932 to make way for new shops.
Some fifty years later the sporting artist John E. Ferneley I shows the change brought about by the coming of the railway, with a level crossing cutting across the street, still a prominent feature of the street to-day. Many of the Georgian buildings are still there and the lower water conduit at St Le Wigford is shown on the right.

Another watercolour view of the High Street around 1820 is by the artist and architect Ambrose Poynter. This is taken from the southerly end of the High Street, fairly close to the Great Bargate (demolished ic.1759) This watercolour is taken from the southerly end of Lincoln High Street, looking northwards towards Lincoln Cathedral. It appears to show St Peter at Gowt's Church on the right hand side and the Little Gowt Drain that crossed the High Street just below the church. The other buildings shown all appear to have been demolished now.

Landmarks
The Stonebow and Guildhall is Lincoln's town gate with a Guildhall above, dating from the 15th century and restored in 1885-57. The figures in the niches are (left) the Archangel Gabriel and (right) the Virgin Mary, patron saint of the city and cathedral. In the centre are the royal coat of arms of James I, dated 1605. It replaced an earlier gate, possibly Norman, but conceivably the south gate of the Roman city.

High Street churches are St Mary le Wigford next to the railway crossing, St Peter at Gowts, and St Botolph's. Former churches (now demolished), were St Martin's at the north of High Street, St Peter at Arches at a corner with Silver Street, St Mark's and St Andrew's.

Former Boots Store
A building was constructed for Boots the Chemist on the eastern side the High Street at the junction with Clasketgate and is currently occupied by a clothes shop. During the 1924 construction of the building the remains of a Roman building were uncovered including a hypocaust, which is on display in the basement of the building.

Gallery

See also
Steep Hill
Lincoln St. Marks railway station

References

City of Lincoln Council

Literature
Antram N (revised), Pevsner N & Harris J, (1989), The Buildings of England: Lincolnshire, Yale University Press.
Stearne K (ed), (2001), The Archaeology of Wigford and Brayford Pool, Lincoln Archaeological Studies No.2, Oxbow Books, Oxford

External links

 Chamber of Commerce
 Lincolnshire Echo, the county's best known newspaper is based in Lincoln

Lincoln, England
Geography of Lincolnshire
Shopping streets in England
Streets in England
Roads in Lincolnshire